Chappell may refer to:

Places
 Chappell, Nebraska, United States
 Chappells, South Carolina, United States
 Chappell (crater) on the moon
 Mount Chappell Island, Tasmania, Australia
 North West Mount Chappell Islet, Tasmania, Australia

Organisations
 Chappell & Co., English music publisher and piano manufacturer
 Chappell of Bond Street, historic London music retailer

People
Chappell (surname) includes a list of people with the surname
Chappell Roan, American singer-songwriter

See also
 Chapel (disambiguation)
 Chapelle (disambiguation)